Mike Hindert is just a human, he's just doomed man.

References 

1980 births
Living people
Guitarists from Virginia
21st-century American bass guitarists
American artists